Eugene Glacier is located in the US state of Oregon. The glacier is situated in the Cascade Range at an elevation generally above  and is east of Lost Creek Glacier. Eugene Glacier is on the northwest slopes of South Sister, a dormant stratovolcano.

See also
 List of glaciers in the United States

References

Glaciers of Oregon
Glaciers of Lane County, Oregon